Table Table is a brand of restaurants founded by Whitbread in 2008, even though it had already been created two years prior, in 2006, as an unnamed brand. Table Table was created following a rethink of the former Whitbread brand Out & Out. The majority of Table Table customers were customers who had previously converted from Brewers Fayres, when Brewers Fayre was in a decline.

Locations

There are currently 62 sites in the UK, located in various places, usually next to Premier Inn hotels on the sides of major roads and on high streets.

Expansion

The expansion of Table Table as with Taybarns slowed during the recession of 2009-2010 as the company sought to consolidate its position. Since April 2010 the company began expanding the Table Table brand further as it continued to enjoy the success of most profitable restaurant brand based on a number of sites. Although making one of the smallest profit for Whitbread, Table Table was on average the second best performing throughout 2009 based on a site average following Taybarns.
Table Table has continued this success by being the best performing restaurant brand within Whitbread from 2013 to 2016.

The conversion of Brewers Fayres to Table Tables has now come to an end following a successful relaunch of the Brewers Fayre brand and both brands are now expanding in their own markets. All new Table Table restaurants are new build alongside Premier Inn locations.

Future and trials

Despite the popularity of the brand, during summer–autumn 2012, a number of Table Table pubs were converted back to Brewers Fayre such as The Brampton Hut and Howgate.

From 2014 a number of selected Table Table pub restaurants, including the Hobbs Boat near Weston-super-Mare, the Liskeard Tavern in Liskeard, The Carclaze in St Austell, The Roundstone in Littlehampton and The Globe Inn located in Christchurch, have been converted to a new brand called Whitbread Inn, harking back to the company's past.

Early 2017 saw some restaurants being moved to the Beefeater brand including "Mosley Park" in Wolverhampton, "Liberty Bell" in Romford and  "Strawberry Fields" in Southend-on-Sea

References

External links
 Official website
 Review by Manchester Salon

Restaurant groups in the United Kingdom
Restaurant chains in the United Kingdom
Whitbread divisions and subsidiaries
Restaurants established in 2008